Tarantula, in comics, may refer to:

 Tarantula (DC Comics) is the name of two characters from DC Comics
 Tarantula (Marvel Comics) is the name of five characters from Marvel Comics, two of whom are villains that fought Spider-Man
 Tarantula is the name of a character from Atlas/Seaboard Comics
 Tarantulas (Transformers), a Predacon in the Beast Wars series that has appeared in the comic books based on the toy

It may also refer to:
Black Tarantula, a Marvel Comics character

See also
Tarantula (disambiguation)